Anjali Narzary is an Indian Bodo language poetess. She is recipient of Sahitya Akademi Award for her poetry "Ang Mabwrwi Dong Daswng" in 2016.

References

Recipients of the Sahitya Akademi Award in Bodo
Living people
Year of birth missing (living people)
Place of birth missing (living people)
Indian women poets
21st-century Indian poets
Bodo people
21st-century Indian women writers